The second-generation Subaru Legacy was marketed in Japan from October 1993, and July 1994 marked the second generation in North America with a full body and chassis revision. The exterior was designed by Olivier Boulay in 1991, during his tenure at Subaru. The tail light appearance on both the sedan and wagon was influenced by the taillights on the SVX.

North American models
The North American Legacy Outback wagon was released in July 1994 and FWD was standard from 1994 to 1995. AWD was first offered in 1995 and was so popular that in 1996, Subaru decided to make AWD standard equipment in all vehicles produced for the North American market from that year to today's current date, excluding the Subaru BRZ.

30th Anniversary Edition (1999)
The 30th Anniversary Edition was a limited production version commemorating the 30th anniversary of Subaru in America. It included upgraded interior and sunroof, spoiler, and alloy wheels on the "L" trim level cars.

Japanese models
Subaru still offered a choice between front- and all-wheel-drive for its domestic market vehicles even after 1995.

GT (1993–1998)
Introduced on launch in October 1993, the Second Generation Subaru Legacy GT introduced Subaru's new Sequential Twin Turbo version of their 1994 cc flat-four engine. The new engine, known as the EJ20H, operated with one small turbocharger at low engine speeds to give good throttle response, supplemented by a second turbocharger at high engine speeds for additional power. Maximum power output was 250 ps (246.6 bhp) at 6,500 rpm and maximum torque was 308.9 Nm (227.8 lbf·ft) at 5,000 rpm.

The GT was available as five-door stepped-roof Touring Wagon (model code BG) or four-door Sedan (model code BD). Sedan versions were only available with Subaru's E-4AT four-speed automatic transmission with 4-Wheel Drive and Variable Torque Distribution Centre Differential (VTD-4WD), while Touring Wagon versions had the additional option of five-speed manual transmission with 4-Wheel Drive and Limited-Slip Viscous Centre Differential (VCD-4WD).

In June 1996, the EJ20H engine was upgraded to 260.0 ps (256.4 bhp) at 6,500 rpm and 318.7 Nm (235.1 lbf·ft) at 5,000 rpm.

GT/B-Spec (1993–1996)

The GT/B-Spec variation was introduced as a wagon-only model in October 1993 as a more sporting version of the Touring Wagon GT (BG5A), and fitted as standard with ABS brakes, Subaru Sports Suspension, and 16x5.5" inch forged BBS cross-spoke alloy wheels. Engine and gearbox specification was the same as the GT, having the 280 ps version of the EJ20H and a choice of either five-speed manual or four-speed automatic gearbox. Unlike the GT, the GT/B-Spec did not come with a power-operated driver's seat and optional extras like driver and passenger airbags, cruise control, sunroof, and wood panel trim was not available.
The "B" in "GT/B-Spec" Stands for the forged BBS wheels that the car came with, out of the factory.

The GT/B-Spec was discontinued in June 1996 with the introduction of the GT-B (BG5B).

RS (1993–1998)
The RS was the GT sedan for the second generation Outback, and available in manual and for the first time automatic transmission. A GT sedan was available, with full leather and automatic transmission only.

GT-B (1996–1999)
Was a Japanese model station wagon introduced in June 1996 (BG5B). It included front and rear Bilstein struts, with the upgrade also available on the RS. The "B" designation stood for Bilstein. The Legacy GT was available for sale around the same time as the Nissan Avenir Salut turbocharged 2.0 L with AWD. The GT-B also offered larger brakes, sway bars, wheels, and some different interior options. Manual versions of the GT-B and RS also featured the EJ20R twin turbo motor, which was the first Legacy to offer 206KW. The manual also shared the TY752VBCAA manual transmission from the Version 3 STi. Auto versions of the GT-B and RS however featured the less powerful EJ20H, as used in the GT.

TS type R

The TS type R, was a 2.0L naturally aspirated DOHC version of the Subaru flat-four, and had comparable trim to the GT's. B spec TS type R's were also available, with the same body kit, interior, wheels, and Bilstein suspension.

250T
The 250T was a 2.5L naturally aspirated DOHC version of the Subaru flat-four, available in full GT trim. B spec 250T's were also available, with the same body kit, wheels, and Bilstein suspension.

GT-B Limited (1997–1998)

The GT-B Limited edition wagon was offered only for the BG5C revision (MY97), with an altered front bumper featuring additional 7 Inch Diameter spotlights alongside the normal GT-B fog lights. Other differences included a woodgrain MOMO wheel and gear knob, not otherwise available. Mechanically they were identical to standard BG5C GTB's.

European models

LPG
The LPG option was introduced as an alternative fuel source on European models with the 2.0 L and 2.2 L engines, built by company Necam Koltec. The fuel tank was installed in the spare tire compartment, with the spare tire installed vertically on the left side of the trunk or cargo area.

Legacy Twin Turbo

Turbocharged versions continued to be available in most international markets. Specialty touring and racing versions were available in Japan, as well as the DOHC 2 liter twin sequential turbocharged (EJ20H & EJ20R) version on both the Legacy sedan and wagon, listed as "Boxer 2-stage Twin Turbo" on the engine cover shroud. This engine was popular with Japanese buyers due to reduced tax liability based on Japanese vehicle size legislation offering performance advantages over larger cars sold there with bigger engines and higher tax assessments. The twin turbo can only be installed on right-hand drive vehicles because the turbo on the left side interferes with both the brake master cylinder and steering linkage, among other things. A minor performance problem with the twin turbo was a "turbo dead zone" before the second turbo would kick in around 4700–5200 rpm. A continuous traction delivery system, called VTD by Subaru, was used with all JDM turbocharged vehicles with automatic transmission. The VTD AWD system is a permanent AWD due to its 36% / 64% split.

Trim levels
The Brighton trim level also carried over from the facelifted first generation version that was priced below the "L" trim option.

The "GT" trim level appeared in 1995 for MY1996. The term "Limited" appeared on the "GT", known as the "GT Limited" for model year 1998. The term "Limited" was used by itself on the Outback for model year 1998.

GT models, first offered as a wagon trim package for the USA version in 1994, became a full-blown upgrade for model year 1996, using the new DOHC 2.5L EJ25D flat-4 engine. GT models continue to the present model, with Limited editions available, offering heated leather or cloth seats and trim and a tinted glass moonroof. Driver and front passenger airbags were added with the redesigned interior. New equipment added to the list of features included RF remote keyless entry, fog lights on the upper trim levels and variable-assist power steering.

Outback

The Outback concept originated with Subaru of America, which was suffering from slumping sales in the mid-1990s partly due to a lack of an entry in the then-burgeoning sport utility vehicle market. Lacking the finances to design an all-new vehicle, Subaru decided to add body cladding and a suspension lift to their Legacy wagon. Named the Legacy Outback, after the Australian outback, actor Paul Hogan was the spokesman in the North American market, playing off the Australian name of the vehicle and portraying the vehicle as a capable and more efficient alternative to large, truck-based SUVs. Sales exceeded expectations, with Tim Mahoney, Senior Vice President of Subaru of America stating "[the Outback] saved our company."

The Legacy Outback was formally introduced to the North American market at the 1994 New York Auto Show, and was known in Japan starting August 1995 as the Legacy Grand Wagon, and in Australia as the Outback, a trim package with normal ground clearance but an "SUV look" with two-tone paint and fog lights. For the 1994 model year, the Legacy wagon in the North American market was available as the Alpine Sport, Outdoor and Sun Sport, which were Value Option Packages included on the "L" trim level wagon, and graphics denoting the option package installed. In Japan the Legacy wagon was called the Legacy Touring Wagon so the Grand wagon nomenclature was meant to signify a more grand, luxurious approach to equipment offered. The exterior was designed by Olivier Boulay, who was hired by Subaru on a short-term basis.

For the 1995 model year, the first year the Outback was introduced, the Outback was a trim package on the base model Legacy wagon "L", that primarily consisted of the heavy cloth interior, berber carpet floor mats, a luggage rack and fog lights with a standard height suspension. This approach was also used on the smaller Impreza wagon, with the name Outback Sport. When the 1996 model year arrived, it gained more aggressive appearing front bumper covers, with larger rallye inspired driving lamps replacing the previously installed fog lights, taller tires with more aggressive tread, and a  ground clearance, with a  ground clearance in Japan. The more aggressive appearance was also used on the smaller Outback Sport while omitting the increase in ground clearance from suspension modification. This approach was inspired by the Legacy having been entered into international rallying and long distance racing events, and winning the 1990 Safari Rally in the Group N category. In 1996, the MY1997 Outback received the hood scoop installed in the engine hood (bonnet) without installing an intercooler, commonly used in conjunction with a turbocharger.

The previous generation Legacy wagon had an optional air suspension, which allowed the driver to temporarily increase the vehicle's ground clearance, however the permanent increased ride height used on the Outback proved to be more practical. Subaru sales had been declining up until that point in North American market. With the help of clever marketing, a trim level called the Outback intent on making the Subaru a more capable multi-terrain vehicle offered an affordable and fuel efficient alternative to the popular SUVs that were outselling Subaru's traditional offerings. The Legacy and Outback wagons were built at the Subaru of Indiana Automotive production facility in Lafayette, Indiana that also manufactured the Isuzu Rodeo and the badge engineered Honda Passport, traditional SUVs with transfer case installed four-wheel-drive and an extended ground clearance.

In September 1997, the Japanese Legacy Grand Wagon was renamed Legacy Lancaster though 1998 cars retained the Grand Wagon nameplate along with the new Lancaster plate. Earlier versions of the Outback continued to use the EJ22 four cylinder engine, while later generations introduced the larger EJ25 four cylinder engine, revised with DOHC and more horsepower. The JDM Grand Wagon and Lancaster were only available with the DOHC 2.5-liter flat-4 engine, receiving a  improvement in 1998. Some Japanese-spec Grand Wagons came with digital climate control, plaid seat upholstery, a dual-range manual transmission and a Momo black leather steering wheel. Because the only engine available in Japan was the 2.5-liter engine, and the engines displacement exceeded Japanese regulations for vehicles classified as a "compact", Japanese buyers of the Grand Wagon were liable for taxes charged to larger cars, and was regarded as a luxury vehicle in Japan. The installation of the 2.5 litre engine in Japanese models also obligated Japanese buyers to pay more annual road tax, further enhancing the luxury image.

All trim levels retained the typical AWD layouts seen in previous generation Legacy, depending on transmission choice. Manual transmission models came with a mechanical "Continuous AWD" system which was normally 50/50 front/rear, and relied on limited slip differentials to redirect power front to rear, rear to front, and from one rear wheel to the other (when fitted with a rear limited slip differential). Automatic transmission models had an electronically controlled AWD system that was 90/10 front/rear and redirected differing amounts of power to the rear wheels continuously. When accelerating or driving uphill, the vehicles weight shifts rearward, reducing front wheel traction, causing the transmission to automatically send torque to the rear wheels to compensate. When braking or driving downhill, the vehicle's weight shifts towards the front, reducing rear wheel traction. The transmission again compensates by sending torque to the front wheels for better steering control and braking performance. If the automatic is placed in Reverse or "1st" gear, the transmission divides the torque 50-50 to both front and rear wheels.

Legacy SUS
The Legacy SUS (short for "Sport Utility Sedan") was launched with a limited production test run sold in USA in 1998 and, based on its success, was rolled out in North America only the following year. The "Limited" trim level package for the Outback wagon was standard equipment on the sedan body, with the addition of a hood scoop and trunk-mounted rear wing. Despite the appearance of the front hood scoop, the SUS was not installed with a turbocharged engine; the only engine installed from Subaru was the naturally-aspirated EJ25D engine. The "SUS" moniker was removed with the introduction of the second generation Outback Sedan. Plastic side cladding was not present on the side doors of the Outback; the lower half of the doors were painted a contrasting color also found on the front and rear bumper covers.

Gallery

Specifications

Chassis types

Equipment
The remote keyless entry can unlock just the drivers door by pushing the unlock button once, while holding down the button unlocks all doors. Using the key to unlock the door after using the remote keyless entry to lock the doors will cause the alarm to sound, if equipped with a security system. The doors must be unlocked with the remote to avoid the security system being set off.

An unusual interior change placed the power window switches flat against the door panel, whereas the window switches for the first generation and third generation extended from the door panels and were oriented in a horizontal position and were located underneath the drivers or occupants hands for easy location and use, and integrated into the door pull and armrest. The express up feature for the driver's window was also removed, leaving express down only. The power door lock switch design was upgraded to a more conventional door lock switch, installed next to the power window switches, with a secondary power lock switch installed for the front passenger. This approach was also used on the 1990–1993 Honda Integra.

Side turn signal repeater lenses that were introduced on the USA 1992–1994 Legacy were replaced by a plastic cap that covers a hole where the side repeater is utilized internationally, and the color of the cap matches the color of the door rub strip on vehicles sold in North America.

Many EJ25D DOHC 2.5 L engines for this generation experienced internal head gasket leakage around 100,000 miles, (160,000 km). Potential causes included head gasket design, and coolant charge and corrosion - aggravated by cavitation caused by the coolant acting as a ground for the car's electrical system, causing it to take on a positive charge.

References

Legacy (2nd generation)
Cars introduced in 1993
Cars powered by boxer engines